Johann Friedrich von Cronegk (2 September 1731 – 1 January 1758) was a German poet. He was born in Ansbach.

Biography 
Cronegk studied law in Halle and Leipzig and visited Italy and France before returning to his hometown to be a court councilor.

He acquired some rank among the noble authors of Germany, and wrote plays which had a temporary success, among them "Codrus" and "Olint and Sophronia."

Bibliography 
Des Freyherrn Johann Friedrich von Cronegk Schriften. Ansbach: Verlag Alte Post 2003. .

1731 births
1758 deaths
German poets
People from Ansbach
People from the Principality of Ansbach
German male poets